Mir Bahadur Khan Khoso (1845–1930) was the son of Mir Dil Murad Khan Khoso, who during the 1857 Mutiny revolted against the British in Jacobabad.  Bahadur Khan was a well known Zamindar (landlord) of Jacobabad District who was said to own a sizable portion of the agricultural lands in Jacobabad.  He was an inventive genius who used to assist government officials with various agricultural problems.  He had lands in all the talukas of District Jacobabad but most of the lands were in taluka Thul.

He and his family served the district from colonial rule till today.  He had four sons: Khan Bahadur Dilmurad Khan (Chairman District Council), Mir Hasan Khan I, Khan Sahib Shahal Khan (MLA West Pakistan Assembly 1953-56) and Sikandar Khan Khoso  (poet). One of his grandsons was Mir Dariya Khan Khoso. He built castles at three of his villages and these castles are still there in Bahadurpur, Bachro and Deenpur where his descendants live. 
Dil murad khan khoso had two sons Khan sahib Sardar Khan Khoso and Ghous Bux Khan Khoso. Khan sahib sardar khan khoso was a well known personality of district Jacobabad and it is said about him that he was the only member of Congress Party who voted for Pakistan's formation and hence a great contribution towards formation of Pakistan.

1845 births
1930 deaths